Balta is a rural locality (an ulus) in Mukhorshibirsky District, Republic of Buryatia, Russia. The population was 301 as of 2010. There are 4 streets.

Geography 
Balta is located 53 km west of Mukhorshibir (the district's administrative centre) by road. Tsolga is the nearest rural locality.

References 

Rural localities in Mukhorshibirsky District